New Libertarian Manifesto is a libertarian philosophical treatise by Samuel Edward Konkin III. It is the first explanation of agorism, a philosophy created by Konkin. Konkin proffers various arguments of how a free society would function as well as examples of existing gray and black markets. It contains criticisms of using political (i.e. activist or legislative) or violent means and advocates non-politics with non-voting as a strategy. Finally, Konkin describes the steps of using the black market to dismantle the state, a strategy known as counter-economics.

The work was first printed by Anarchosamisdat Press in October 1980, and subsequently by Koman Publishing Co. in February 1983 and by KoPubCo in 2006. Konkin declared the book to be a "black market best-seller".

Reception
Libertarian Robert LeFevre hailed the work "for its position respecting consistency, objective and method" and claimed that "it will have and deserves to have a compelling influences upon members of the 'old' left."

References

Further reading 
 Rothbard, Murray. Strategy of the New Libertarian Alliance, Number One, May Day 1981, 3–11; reprinted as “The Anti-Party Mentality” in Libertarian Vanguard, Aug.-Sep. 1981.

External links
New Libertarian Manifesto in PDF form from agorism.eu.org

1980 documents
Agorism
Libertarian books
Libertarian theory
Political manifestos